Santiago Ernesto Domínguez Servín (born 9 October 1991) is a Mexican professional boxer. He has held the WBC-USNBC Silver and WBC FECARBOX welterweight titles since 2019.

Early life
Domínguez compiled a 62–4 record (36 KO) as an amateur, with his strict father keeping him and his younger brother Marcos in the gym and away from trouble on the streets of Ciudad Obregón, Sonora.

Professional career
Domínguez made his professional debut on 22 August 2014, defeating Arturo Camargo with a first-round TKO in his hometown of Ciudad Obregón. After winning his first 11 bouts, he faced Jorge Valenzuela for the vacant  Americas super lightweight title on 13 July 2018 in Ensenada. Fighting on the same card as his younger brother, he beat Valenzuela by way of unanimous decision for his first minor belt.

On 30 May 2019, Domínguez defeated compatriot Jorge Rodríguez in Phoenix, his first fight outside of Mexico, earning him a shot at the vacant WBC FECARBOX welterweight title. He beat Noé Núñez four weeks later in Ciudad Obregón for the belt, again fighting on the same night as his brother. He then fought Tanzanian veteran Fabian Lyimo in San Diego, stopping him in the second round with repeated hooks to the body for his 19th consecutive victory.

Domínguez won the vacant WBC–USNBC Silver welterweight title on 7 November 2019, knocking out Uzbekistani challenger Ravshan Hudaynazarov in just 43 seconds in Tucson, Arizona. In December, it was announced that he would be defending his belt the following month against Brazilian Vitor Jones Freitas in the co-featured event of a Roy Jones Jr. Promotions card. However, Domínguez fell ill and the fight was scrapped at the last minute.

Professional boxing record

Personal life
Domínguez now resides in Forth Worth, Texas.

References

External links
 

Living people
1991 births
Mexican male boxers
Light-welterweight boxers
Welterweight boxers
Boxers from Sonora
Boxers from Texas
People from Ciudad Obregón
Sportspeople from Fort Worth, Texas
20th-century Mexican people
21st-century Mexican people